-ista is a suffix that denotes a specialist or performer of a certain topic, or an advocate of a belief. It is a regular suffix in Romance languages. It is infrequently used in English, which typically uses the suffix -ist for this purpose.

 Baptista (disambiguation), a name
 Barista, a person who serves coffee
 Calista (disambiguation), a place or name
 Callista (disambiguation), a genus of molluscs or a place or name
 Corbynista, a supporter of Leader of the Labour Party Jeremy Corbyn
 Evangelista (disambiguation), a name of many notable people
 Fashionista (disambiguation), related to fashion
 Protista, a biological kingdom name for diverse group of eukaryotic microorganisms
 Sandinista, related to a Nicaraguan political party
 Stylista, an American fashion-themed reality-television competition
 Zapatista (disambiguation), a follower of Emiliano Zapata or his ideas

ista